Chrysolina fastuosa, also known as the dead-nettle leaf beetle, is a species of beetle from a family of Chrysomelidae found in Europe, Caucasus and northern Turkey.

Description
C. fastuosa has a gold shine that transitions to a green or violet-blue longitudinal stripe near the shoulder band of the elytra as well as near the suture. Occasionally, specimen of C. fastuosa may be completely green or black in colour.

Ecology 
Adults and larvae of C. fastuosa feed on various plants in the family Lamiaceae, including hemp-nettle (Galeopsis) and dead-nettle (Lamium). It is also known from common nettle (Urtica dioica), which is in family Urticaceae. Adults and larvae graze on leaves, while larvae may also be found in fruiting calyxes.

Larvae are parasitised by the tachinid fly Macquartia grisea.

References

External links

Beetles described in 1763
Chrysomelinae
Articles containing video clips
Taxa named by Giovanni Antonio Scopoli